Adrián Vallés Iñarrea (born 16 March 1995 in Pamplona) is a Spanish athlete specialising in the pole vault. He competed at the 2015 World Championships in Beijing without qualifying for the final.

His personal bests in the event are 5.65 metres outdoors (Storrs 2015) and 5.47 metres indoors (Columbus 2015).

Competition record

References

External links
 

1995 births
Living people
Sportspeople from Pamplona
Spanish male pole vaulters
World Athletics Championships athletes for Spain
University of Cincinnati alumni
Spanish Athletics Championships winners